Hathor 26 - Coptic Calendar - Hathor 28

The twenty-seventh day of the Coptic month of Hathor, the third month of the Coptic year. On a common year, this day corresponds to November 23, of the Julian Calendar, and December 6, of the Gregorian Calendar. This day falls in the Coptic season of Peret, the season of emergence. This day falls in the Nativity Fast.

Commemorations

Saints 

 The martyrdom of Saint James the Persian

Other commemorations 

 The consecration the Church of Saint Victor the son of Romanos

References 

Days of the Coptic calendar